NMX or nmx may refer to:

 ticker symbol of the New York Mercantile Exchange at the New York Stock Exchange
 ISO code for the Nama language of Papua New Guinea

Railway stations
 station code of the New Maynaguri railway station, India
 station code of the Marxgrün station, Germany

See also
 MMX (disambiguation)